Hero at Large is a 1980 American superhero comedy film starring John Ritter and Anne Archer.

The film was written by AJ Carothers and directed by Martin Davidson. The original music score was composed by Patrick Williams.

Plot
Steve Nichols is a struggling New York City actor who accepts the job of posing as comic-book hero for a movie he's hired to help promote. After he stops a robbery while wearing the "Captain Avenger" costume, his life becomes unexpectedly complicated. Nichols decides to continue "playing" superhero and discovers that a hero's life is more complex than he expected.

Nichols is hired by the Mayor's staff who hope the Captain Avenger's tie-in will win votes for an upcoming election. The plan is ultimately discovered and exposed by the media, leaving Captain Avenger on the outs with the public. Encouraged by his girlfriend, Jolene, to not rely on the costume and mask to gain adulation, Nichols later becomes a bona fide hero when he rescues a child from a burning apartment building.

Cast

In addition, Joyce Brothers has a cameo as herself, while Penny Crone, an Emmy Award-winning reporter in the New York City market, has an uncredited cameo as a reporter.

Reception
Roger Ebert gave the film 2 out of 4 stars and called it "a big, dumb, silly, good-hearted albatross of a comedy". He said that although the film might appeal to fans of Ritter, it didn't appeal to him.

See also
Blankman, a 1994 action comedy with a similar premise.
 Kick-Ass, a 2010 action comedy with a similar premise.
 Vigilante film

References

External links
 
 
 
 

1980 films
1980 comedy films
American superhero comedy films
1980s English-language films
Films about actors
Films directed by Martin Davidson
Films scored by Patrick Williams
Films set in New York City
Metro-Goldwyn-Mayer films
1980s American films